Olavi Laaksonen (26 July 1921 – 27 October 2004) was a Finnish footballer who competed in the 1952 Summer Olympics.

References

1921 births
2004 deaths
Finnish footballers
Olympic footballers of Finland
Footballers at the 1952 Summer Olympics
Finnish football managers
Finland national football team managers
Finland B international footballers
Association football goalkeepers
Turun Palloseura footballers
Finland international footballers